Rolf's Cartoon Club is a British television show presented by Rolf Harris, first broadcast on CITV between 1989 and 1993.

The show had some similarities to Harris' earlier BBC programme, Rolf's Cartoon Time, in that it saw him introducing cartoons and drawing pictures of characters from them. The cartoons shown were mostly those of Warner Bros., but included animations from Raymond Briggs and John Lasseter. Harris also explored animation techniques and gave viewers tips for making their own cartoons at home.

Rolf's Cartoon Club was, as well as being a television programme, also an actual club that viewers could join. Members received a club badge featuring the "Rolfaroo" character, as well as regular newsletters featuring information on the television programme. Lasseter was club member number one.

For much of Cartoon Club, Harris was seated in the "Cartoon Cockpit", a studio with an easel and various art and animation equipment. Part of each programme, however, was given over to the workshop, where Harris would assist a group of club members in making their own animation.

In later series, celebrity guests appeared on the programme to discuss their favourite cartoons with Harris.

Harris had been brought to ITV by Victor Glynn, then at Portman Entertainment and the programme was created by Peter Murphy, the then Head of Children's Programmes at HTV in Bristol.

Series
Series 1: 21 x 25' – 6 April 1989 – 31 August 1989
Christmas Special – 22 December 1989
Series 2: 22 x 25' – 3 January 1990 – 30 May 1990
Series 3: 24 x 25' – 5 September 1990 – 27 February 1991
Series 4: 15 x 25' – 5 September 1991 – 18 December 1991
Series 5: 14 x 25' – 10 September 1992 – 17 December 1992 
Series 6: 11 x 25' – 9 September 1993 – 28 October 1993

(Source : ITV Network)

References

External links

Homage to the children's television show

Rolf Harris
1980s British children's television series
1990s British children's television series
1989 British television series debuts
1993 British television series endings
British television series with live action and animation
English-language television shows
ITV children's television shows
Television shows produced by Harlech Television (HTV)
Television series by ITV Studios